PLA may refer to:

Organizations

Politics and military
 People's Liberation Army, the armed forces of China and of the ruling Chinese Communist Party
 People's Liberation Army (disambiguation)
 Irish National Liberation Army, formerly called the People's Liberation Army
 People's Liberation Army (Lebanon)
 People's Liberation Army of Manipur, India
 Palestine Liberation Army, the military wing of the Palestine Liberation Organization
 ProLife Alliance, a former UK political party

Other organizations
 Pacific Locomotive Association, operator of the Niles Canyon Railway in California, US
 Pakistan Library Association
 Pediatric Leadership Alliance, of the American Academy of Pediatrics
 Phone Losers of America, a US phone phreaking group

 Port of London Authority, England
 Pre-school Learning Alliance, England
 Public Library Association, a US professional association

Science and technology
 Principle of least astonishment, a principle in software design
 Programmable logic array, a semiconductor device
 Proximity ligation assay, to detect proteins
 Polylactic acid, a biodegradable plastic, commonly used in 3D printing
 Protected landscape areas, areas with natural, ecological or cultural values

Other uses
 Prior learning assessment, in education
 Project Labor Agreement, a collective bargaining agreement
 Pulau Aie railway station in Padang, West Sumatra, Indonesia (station code)
 Rafael Cordero Santiago Port of the Americas, a megaport in Puerto Rico
 Pokémon Legends: Arceus, a 2022 action role-playing game developed for the Nintendo Switch

See also
 Pla (disambiguation)
 Phospholipase A1 (PLA1)
 Phospholipase A2 (PLA2)